María Onetto (18 August 1966 – 2 March 2023) was an Argentine theatre, film, and television actress. She received the a 2011 Konex Award in entertainment for her theatrical work, and is also well known for her role in the 2006 Argentine TV series Montecristo, for which she won the Clarín and Martín Fierro Awards as best actress in drama and rising star. She also directed a localized production of rock musical Passing Strange in 2011.

Onetto was born in Buenos Aires on 18 August 1966. She was the daughter of Estela Mary Pastore and Jorge Onetto, an employee of the energy company Segba and restaurateur who died of a sudden myocardial infarction in 1967 when María was one year old. The family lived in the suburb of Martínez, Buenos Aires. She was enrolled in a nuns' school, and at age 17 she began studying psychology at the University of Buenos Aires, where she took up acting in the theater. She graduated in four years and for a time worked in the same school as her mother, preparing psycho-pedagogical reports. In 1991 she entered Sportivo Teatral, Ricardo Bartís's theater workshop, which she greatly enjoyed. After taking classes there, she taught other actors. She left in 1996, planning to study literature, and moved to Benavídez, Argentina, but found she did want to be an actress, which she began with Rafael Spregelburd's production Dragging the Cross, after which she ceased other work to focus solely on acting.

Onetto starred in Lucrecia Martel's 2008 film The Headless Woman, playing Veroníca, a middle-aged woman who becomes haunted by guilt and disconnected from her normal life after a hit and run with an unidentified object.

Onetto featured in a 2021 production of Eduardo "Tato" Pavlovsky's 1987 play Potestad (lit. Power) directed by Norman Briski, which takes inspiration from Noh theater and in which Onetto plays a girl's kidnapper during Argentina's last dictatorship.

Maria Onetto was found dead in her apartment in Buenos Aires on 2 March 2023, at the age of 56. Information released by the Buenos Aires City Police confirmed that she had committed suicide.

Film 
 2000: Lejanía (short film)
 2005: Cuatro mujeres descalzas
 2006: La punta del diablo
 2007: The Other, as the hotel receptionist
 2007: Arizona sur, as the patron
 2008: The Headless Woman, as Verónica
 2008: Horizontal / Vertical, as Guadalupe
 2009: Nunca estuviste tan adorable, as Blanca
 2009: Rompecabezas, as María del Carmen
 2013: El cerrajero
 2014: The Seagull (adaptation)
 2014: Wild tales
 2015: La vida después
 2017: The Heavy Hand of the Law

Television 
 2004: El disfraz, as la Dra. Lavalle
 2005: Mujeres asesinas 1
 Episode 3: "Claudia, cuchillera"
 Episode 10: "Stella, huérfana emocional"
 Episode 19: "Patricia, vengadora"
 2006: Montecristo, as Leticia Lombardo
 2008: Mujeres asesinas 4; Episode 11: "Noemí, desquiciada"
 2009: Tratame bien, as Elsa
 2010: Lo que el tiempo nos dejó
 2011: Televisión x la inclusión; Chapter 11: "Daños y prejuicios"
 2012: 23 pares
 2014: Santos y pecadores: Televisión x la justicia; Chapter 6: "Lazos que duelen"
 2014: La celebración; Chapter 4: "Bautismo"
 2014: En terapia
 2016: La pulsera
 2017: Mis noches sin ti
 2018–2019: Mi hermano es un clon, as Elena Mónaco
 2023: Ringo, gloria y muerte

Theater 
 2011: Los hijos se han dormido
 2013: Sonata de Otoño
 2016: Idénticos
 2017: Sobre Mirjana y los que la rodean
 2017: Pequeño estado de gracia
 2019: La persona deprimida

Awards and nominations

References

External links 
 
 María Onetto at the National Cinema website
 Biography of María Onetto at the Konex Foundation

1966 births
2023 deaths
21st-century Argentine actresses
Actresses from Buenos Aires
Argentine film actresses
Argentine stage actresses
Argentine telenovela actresses
Suicides in Argentina